Josh Tyler (born 17 December 1990) is a Welsh rugby union player. A Lock forward, he played for UWIC RFC before making his debut for the Welsh regional team Newport Gwent Dragons on 27 January 2012 versus the Ospreys He was released by Newport Gwent Dragons at the end of the 2012–13 season.

References

External links 
 Newport Gwent Dragons profile

Welsh rugby union players
Dragons RFC players
Living people
1990 births
Rugby union locks